Atif Aslam is a Pakistani playback singer, songwriter, composer, and actor. His first song, "Aadat", won him three awards. "Tu Jaane Na" won him an award and received three other nominations. "Jeena Jeena" and "Jeene Laga Hoon" were also nominated twice. In 2008, Aslam received the Tamgha-e-Imtiaz (medal of distinction), the fourth-highest civilian honour from the Pakistani government, as well as numerous Lux Style Awards. In 2019, he was awarded a star in the Dubai Walk of Fame upon his nomination as the "Best Singer in Pakistan". He has won six Lux Style Awards and received five Filmfare nominations.

Aslam has won the following awards and nominations in Pakistan, India, and other countries.

Indus Music Awards 

Aslam has won three awards in the categories of best song, best composition, and best lyrics.

Sahara Sangeet Awards 
Aslam has won two awards in the categories of Best Playback Singer and Best Debut Singer.

The Musik Awards 

Aslam won an award in 2008 and was also nominated in 2006 in the category Most Wanted Male.

Lux Style Awards 

The Lux Style Awards is an award ceremony held annually in Pakistan since 2002. The awards celebrate "style" in the Pakistani entertainment industry, and it is the oldest event dedicated to the cinema, television, fashion, music, and the film industry in Pakistan. Aslam has won seven awards with two additional nominations.

MTV Brrr Music Awards 

Aslam has been nominated twice.

Filmfare Awards 

The Filmfare Awards are a set of awards that honour artistic and technical excellence in the Hindi-language film industry of India. Atif has been nominated five times but has not won an award.

Lycra MTV Style Awards 

Aslam has won one Lycra award.

IIFA Awards 

The International Indian Film Academy Awards (also known as the IIFA Awards) are a set of awards presented annually by the International Indian Film Academy to honour both artistic and technical excellence of professionals in Bollywood, the Hindi-language film industry. Aslam has won two awards, with one additional nomination.

Star Screen Awards 

The Star Screen Awards is an annual awards ceremony held in India honouring professional excellence in Bollywood. Aslam has been nominated twice.

Guild Awards 

Aslam has been nominated one time.

Zee Cine Awards 

Zee Cine Award (also called ZCA) is an award ceremony for the Hindi film industry. They were instituted in November 1997 to award "Excellence in cinema – the democratic way".

GiMA Awards 
The Global Indian Music Academy Awards (also known as the GiMA Awards) are presented annually by the Global Indian Music Academy to honour and recognise Indian music. The nominees are voted by GiMA's jury, which includes some of the most respected artists in the country. GiMA provides a cohesive platform to celebrate and recognize the contribution of those who push the boundaries in Indian music. The Global Indian Music Academy Awards honour film and non-film music in separate categories.

Big Star Entertainment Awards 

Big Star Entertainment Awards were presented annually by Reliance Broadcast Network Limited in association with Star India to honour personalities from the field of entertainment across movies, music, television, sports, theatre, and dance.

MTV IGGY Awards

Pakistan Media Awards 

The Pakistan Media Awards (commonly known as the PMA), are a set of awards given annually for radio, television, film and theatre achievements. The awards are given each year at a formal ceremony.

The BrandLaureate International Awards

Bollywood Hungama Surfer's Choice Music Awards

Big Apple Music Awards

World Music Awards

Hum Style Awards

Shaan-e-Pakistan Music Achievements

See also 
 List of awards and nominations received by Ali Zafar
 List of awards and nominations received by Rahat Fateh Ali Khan
 Atif Aslam discography

References 

Atif Aslam
Aslam, Atif